Angous is a commune in the Pyrénées-Atlantiques department in the Nouvelle-Aquitaine region of southwestern France.

The inhabitants of the commune are known as Angousiens or Angousiennes

Geography
Angous is located some 5 km south-west of Navarrenx and 12 km north-east of Mauléon-Licharre. It can be accessed by the D2 road which runs from Navarrenx and forms the south-eastern border of the commune before continuing to Moncayolle-Larrory-Mendibieu. Access to the village is by the D69 road which runs off the D2 to the village. The commune consists of mainly farmland with patches of forest.

Located on the watershed of the Adour, the Serrot, a tributary of the Lausset, with many tributaries flows through the commune from south-west to north-east passing near the village. The Ruisseau de Lassere  with many tributaries also flows from the south-west towards the northeast to the east of the village and forms part of the eastern border.

Places and Hamlets

 Beigbédé
 Bestit
 Bois de Carrié
 Bonnehoun
 Bordenave
 Cabane
 Caillau
 Carrié
 Chincas
 Claverie
 Denis
 Jaquet
 Labadie
 Labatut
 Labourdette
 Lagrave
 Lahaderne
 Larrieu
 Lartigue
 Lauga
 Ligaray
 Maréchal
 Miranda
 Mirassou
 Montjoye
 Mouliet
 Nabarre (ruins)
 Olive
 Parfouby
 Poumirau
 Pucheu
 Serbielle
 Serrot
 Trouilh

Neighbouring communes and villages

Toponymy
The commune name in Gascon is Angós which means "marshy terrain" according to Michel Grosclaude and Brigitte Jobbé-Duval

The following table details the origins of the commune name and other names in the commune.

Sources:

Raymond: Topographic Dictionary of the Department of Basses-Pyrenees, 1863, on the page numbers indicated in the table. 
Grosclaude: Toponymic Dictionary of communes, Béarn, 2006 
Cassini: Cassini Map from 1750
Ldh/EHESS/Cassini: 

Origins:

Census: Census of Béarn
Reformation: Reformation of Béarn
Insinuations: Insinuations of the Diocese of Oloron 
Notaries: Notaries of Navarrenx
Angous: Titles of Angous.

History
Paul Raymond noted on page 6 of the 1863 dictionary that the commune had a Lay Abbey, a vassal of the Viscount of Béarn. In 1385 there were 12 fires in Angous and it depended on the bailiwick of Navarrenx.
 
The barony of Gabaston, a vassal of the Viscount of Béarn, was made up of Angous, Navailles, and Susmiou.

Administration

List of Successive Mayors

Inter-communality
The commune is part of six inter-communal structures:
 the Communauté de communes du Béarn des Gaves;
 the inter-communal association for Gaves and of Saleys;
 the mixed forestry association for the oak groves in the Basque and béarnais valleys;
 the collection association of Navarrenx;
 the AEP association of Navarrenx;
 the energy association of Pyrénées-Atlantiques.

Demography
In 2017 the commune had 102 inhabitants.

Economy
The activity is directed mainly towards agriculture (livestock grazing, market gardening, and horticultural crops). The town is part of the Appellation d'origine contrôlée (AOC) zone of Ossau-iraty.

Culture and Heritage

Religious heritage

The Parish Church of Saint-André (1847) is registered as an historical monument.

Church Gallery

The sect Tabitha's place has a property of eleven hectares in the commune.

See also
Communes of the Pyrénées-Atlantiques department

References

External links
Angous on the 1750 Cassini Map

Communes of Pyrénées-Atlantiques